Below are articles related to defectors of North and South Korea.

 North Korean defectors, often going to South Korea
North Koreans in South Korea
 South Korean defectors (to North Korea)

See also 
 List of North Korean defectors in South Korea
North Korea–South Korea relations